Boron deficiency may refer to:
 Boron deficiency (plant disorder), a nutritional disorder in plants
 Boron deficiency (medicine), a nutritional disorder in animals